Gerhard Fellner (born 24 April 1970) is a football manager and former player.

Coaching career

Early career
Fellner started his coaching career as an assistant coach at First Vienna FC in 2010 and was promoted to head coach on 12 June 2013. However, his tenure as head coach lasted  days and was sacked on 4 August 2013. Fellner had lost all three league matches; losing his first 2 league matches 4–1 and his last match 3–0. He had won his Austrian Cup match 2–1.

Coaching record

References

External links

1970 births
Living people
Austrian footballers
Austrian Football Bundesliga players
Austrian expatriate footballers
Expatriate footballers in Scotland
Scottish Football League players
FC Red Bull Salzburg players
Falkirk F.C. players
St Mirren F.C. players
FC Admira Wacker Mödling players
LASK players
First Vienna FC players
Austrian football managers
First Vienna FC managers
Association football defenders
SK Austria Klagenfurt managers
People from Saalfelden
Footballers from Salzburg (state)